Chaukhandi is a village in Barauli Gram panchayat in Bilhaur Tehsil, Kanpur Nagar district, Uttar Pradesh, India. Village code is 149943.

References

Villages in Kanpur Nagar district